Johan Rudolf "Starke Rudolf" Svensson (27 March 1899 – 4 December 1978) was a Swedish wrestler. He competed at the 1924, 1928 and 1932 Summer Olympics in four freestyle and Greco-Roman events in total, and won a gold or silver medal in each of them.

Svensson was most successful in the Greco-Roman light-heavyweight category, in which he won two European titles in 1925 and 1933, seven national titles in 1926–36, two silver medals at the world championships, and three at the European Championships. A firefighter by profession, Svensson also played minor roles in several Swedish movies between 1934 and 1952. In 2005 he was inducted into the International Wrestling Hall of Fame.

References

External links

profile

1899 births
1978 deaths
Olympic wrestlers of Sweden
Wrestlers at the 1924 Summer Olympics
Wrestlers at the 1928 Summer Olympics
Wrestlers at the 1932 Summer Olympics
Swedish male sport wrestlers
Olympic gold medalists for Sweden
Olympic silver medalists for Sweden
Olympic medalists in wrestling
Medalists at the 1924 Summer Olympics
Medalists at the 1928 Summer Olympics
Medalists at the 1932 Summer Olympics
World Wrestling Championships medalists
Swedish male film actors
Sportspeople from Västra Götaland County
20th-century Swedish people